Pete Santora is a retired professional soccer player.

College career
Santora was a two-time All-American for Furman University and protege of legendary coach Moses Carper.

Professional career
Santora spent the 1998 USISL A-League season playing for the Albuquerque Geckos making 16 appearances.

Santora spent the 1999 USL A-League season playing for the Jacksonville Cyclones making 14 appearances.

References

1976 births
Living people
American soccer players
Furman Paladins men's soccer players
A-League (1995–2004) players
Jacksonville Cyclones players
Albuquerque Geckos players
All-American men's college soccer players

Association footballers not categorized by position